Events from the year 1773 in art.

Events
 July 25 – Francisco Goya marries Josefa Bayeu.
 Ulrika Pasch elected in to the Royal Swedish Academy of Arts

Paintings

 John Singleton Copley – Portrait of Mrs Winslow
 François-Hubert Drouais – Portrait of Marie Antoinette
 Dmitry Levitzky – Portraits of the young ladies of the Smolny Institute in Saint Petersburg
 Charles Willson Peale – Family Group portrait
 Sir Joshua Reynolds – Lady Anne Luttrell, The Duchess of Cumberland
 Joseph Wright of Derby – Earthstopper on the Banks of the Derwent
 Melchior Wyrsch – Reginald Pole Carew
 Joseph Vernet – A Shipwreck in Stormy Seas

Awards

Births
 January 5 – Pieter Fontijn, Dutch painter and drawer (died 1839)
 January 31 – Luigi Pichler, German-Italian artist in engraved gems (died 1854)
 July 7 – Moses Haughton the Younger,  English engraver and painter of portrait miniatures (died 1849)
 December 9 – Marianne Ehrenström, Swedish writer, singer, painter, pianist, culture personality, and memorialist (died 1867)
 December 16 – José Aparicio, Spanish painter of the Neoclassic period (died 1838)
 date unknown
 Edward Wedlake Brayley, English enameller, topographer, and writer (died 1854)
 John Comerford, Irish miniature painter (died 1832)
 Carl Conjola, German landscape painter (died 1831)
 Luigi Rados, Italian engraver (died 1840)
 Naitō Toyomasa, Japanese sculptor of netsuke from Tanba Province (died 1856)

Deaths
 February 15 – Anna Maria Barbara Abesch, Swiss reverse glass painter (born 1706)
 March 1 – Luigi Vanvitelli, Italian engineer and architect (born 1700)
 March 26 – Johan Ross the Elder, Swedish painter (born 1695)
 April 20 – Hubert-François Gravelot, French illustrator (born 1699)
 July 2 – Dirk van der Burg, Dutch artist, landscape painter and watercolourist (born 1721)
 August 19 – Francesco Zahra, Maltese painter (born 1710)
 August 30 – Nicolau Nasoni, artist and architect (born 1691)
 September 13 – Anton Janša, Slovene beekeeper and painter (born 1734)
 December 4 – Anton Losenko, Ukrainian-Russian Neoclassical painter who specialized in historical subjects and portraits (born 1737)
 December 22 – Georg Friedrich Strass, Alsatian jeweler and inventor of imitation gemstones and the rhinestone (born 1701)
 date unknown
 Gerhard Bockman, Dutch portrait painter and mezzotint engraver (born 1686)
 Thomas-Joachim Hébert, French ébéniste and furniture designer (born 1687)
 Jakob Klukstad, Norwegian wood carver and painter (born 1705)
 Antonio Rossi – Italian painter of the late-Baroque or Rococo period (born 1700)
 József Lénárd Wéber, Hungarian sculptor (born 1702)
 Marcos Zapata, Peruvian Quechua painter (born 1710)

 
Years of the 18th century in art
1770s in art